Aleksey Vladimirovich Mishin (born February 8, 1979 in Ruzayevka) is a Russian former wrestler.

Career 
Mishin won a gold medal in Greco-Roman wrestling, 84 kg division, at the 2004 Summer Olympics. He was also the 2007 world champion and 2001, 2003, 2005 and 2006 European champion.

Personal life 
Mishin dated world champion and Olympic medalist in fencing Sofia Velikaya from 2008 to 2017. They have two children together, a son, named Oleg, born on November 30, 2013, and a daughter Zoya.

References

Alexei Michine – Russian Wrestling Federation
Original Reddit.com post

1979 births
Living people
Russian male sport wrestlers
Olympic wrestlers of Russia
Wrestlers at the 2004 Summer Olympics
Wrestlers at the 2008 Summer Olympics
Olympic gold medalists for Russia
Olympic medalists in wrestling
Medalists at the 2004 Summer Olympics
World Wrestling Championships medalists